"Emina" is a poem by Bosnian Serb poet Aleksa Šantić that became a popular sevdalinka song, covered by many prominent singers from Bosnia and Herzegovina and other parts of former Yugoslavia. It was first published in 1902 in the Serbian literary journal Kolo. The subject of the poem is Šantić's neighbor, a Bosnian Muslim girl named Emina Sefić. It is one of the most well-known sevdalinka songs of all time.

Main character 

Emina Sefić (later Koluder; 1884–1967) was born to a Bosnian Muslim family in the city of Mostar, Bosnia and Herzegovina. Her father was a prominent imam and the family lived near Stari Most; they were next door neighbors to poet Aleksa Šantić's sister. Her great-granddaughter Alma Ferović is a soprano and has performed with Elton John and A.R. Rahman.

Statue 

On 27 May 2010 a bronze statue of Emina was unveiled in Mostar. It was unveiled on Šantić's 142nd birthday, although it's not publicly known if that was intentionally done or coincidental. The Emina statue was sculpted by Zlatko Dizdarević over the period of three months and was not based on photographs of her, rather the artistic vision of a Bosnian beauty. The statue was sculpted with clothing that women wore in Bosnia and Herzegovina at the turn of the century.

Lyrics 

Many artists have covered the song, but the version by fellow Mostar native, Bosnian singer Himzo Polovina, remains the most popular. Upon hearing of the death of Emina Sefić, Polovina went to poetess Sevda Katica's home in the Mostar neighbourhood Donja Mahala. He found her in the yard of the family home, informed her of Emina's death and she shuddered with grief and spoke the verses:

Himzo Polovina recorded the song and added Sevda's new verses.

Legacy
Some have suggested adopting the words from "Emina" as the lyrics for the wordless Bosnian national anthem, due to its connection to Bosniaks, Croats, and Serbs (the three main Bosnian ethnic groups) alike.

Covers 

 Amira Medunjanin
 Divanhana
 Himzo Polovina
Maja Milinković
 Ibrahim Jukan
 Ibrica Jusić
 Nedeljko Bilkić
 Nihad Hrustanbegovic
 Saša Matić
 Božo Vrećo

See also 

 List of Bosnia and Herzegovina folk songs
 Sevdalinka
 Kraj potoka bistre vode
 Moj dilbere
 Sejdefu majka buđaše

References 

Serbian literature
Bosnia and Herzegovina songs
Bosniak culture
Sevdalinka
Bosnia and Herzegovina literature